Ancema ctesia, the bi-spot royal, is a species of blue butterfly (Lycaenidae) found in Pakistan and India.

The larvae feed on Viscum articulatum.

Subspecies
The following subspecies are recognised:
Ancema ctesia ctesia (Sikkim, Assam, Thailand, Peninsular Malaya, possibly Bhutan and Burma)
Ancema ctesia agalla (Fruhstorfer, 1912) (Thailand, Laos, southern Yunnan, Sichuan)
Ancema ctesia cakravasti (Fruhstorfer, 1909) (Taiwan)

References

Remelanini
Butterflies of Asia
Butterflies described in 1865
Taxa named by William Chapman Hewitson